Applesauce is a 2015 black comedy film written and directed by Onur Tukel.  The film stars Tukel, Max Casella, Trieste Kelly Dunn, Jennifer Prediger, and Dylan Baker.

Cast
Max Casella as Les
Trieste Kelly Dunn as Nicki
Jennifer Prediger as Kate
Onur Tukel as Ron
Dylan Baker as Stevie Bricks
Karl Jacob as Wally
Kevin Scanlon as Officer Prince
Ariel Kavoussi as Officer Potts
Kimber Monroe as Cameron
Jahmani Perry as Principal Clark
Lisa Tharps as Rain's Mother
Bill Weeden as Kate's Father

Release
Applesauce premiered at the Tribeca Film Festival on April 19, 2015.  The film was distributed by MPI Media Group and was released on VOD and DVD on November 24, 2015.

Reception

Critical response
Applesauce received a positive response from critics.  The film holds a 71% positive "Fresh" rating on the review aggregator Rotten Tomatoes.  Ronnie Scheib of Variety praised Applesauce as "Onur Tukel's latest and most accomplished microbudget exercise in cynical absurdism" and added, "With its sarcastic dialogue, deadpan humor, believably flawed characters and surreal logic, 'Applesauce' may expand Tukel's growing indie fan base into niche release."  Eric Kohn of Indiewire gave the film a modest "B" rating, calling it a "spot-on urban satire."  He further wrote:
Conversely, Justin Lowe of The Hollywood Reporter criticized the script for possessing "an unfavorable view of human nature that it’s difficult to identify any likeable characters, most of whom are constantly scheming to manipulate and discredit one another."  He added:

References

External links

2015 films
2015 black comedy films
American black comedy films
Films shot in New York (state)
Films shot in New York City
Films directed by Onur Tukel
2015 comedy horror films
American comedy horror films
2010s English-language films
2010s American films